Ascensus, LLC. is an American financial services company. It offers savings plans of various kinds. It was founded in 1980; the head office is in Dresher, Pennsylvania.

History and ownership 
In 2015, Ascensus was offered for sale by private equity investment firm JC Flowers. In the fourth quarter of 2015, the company was acquired by Genstar Capital and Aquiline Capital Partners. The company is a NAFCU (National Association of Federally-Insured Credit Unions) Preferred Partner.

In April 2020, Kevin Cox was appointed Head of Retirement Business at Ascensus. Mr. Cox succeeds Shannon Kelly, who will take a professional Sabbatical after nearly 20 years at the company while Peg Creonte succeeds Mr. Cox as head of his business line of government savings.

In 2021, Ascensus was sold by Genstar Capital and Aquiline Capital Partners to Stone Point Capital LLC and GIC for $3 billion.

Retirement savings

In December 2016, Ascensus was chosen to manage the Oregon Retirement Savings Plan, the first state-sponsored retirement savings plan in the country. With it, Oregon aims to cover around 1 million working citizens who are currently not covered by an employer-sponsored retirement plan. The program launched in July 2017.

Ascensus was also chosen to manage Illinois’ retirement savings program, Secure Choice, in July 2017. Secure Choice was launched in phases in 2018 and 2019. The program is expected to cover 1.2 million workers.

In August 2018, it was announced that Ascensus would administer California's retirement savings program, CalSavers. In July 2019, California began offering 7 million workers the opportunity to contribute to an IRA through CalSavers.

College savings
In 2013, Ascensus acquired Upromise Investments, Sallie Mae's 529 college savings plan administrator. This resulted in the formation of its government savings division. The company also manages Ugift, its third-party giving program allowing family and friends to transfer money into 529 plans.

In 2015, Ascensus Government Savings was selected to manage the Rhode Island state 529 plan, CollegeBoundfund, in partnership with Invesco. In June 2016, Ascensus opened a branch in Warwick, Rhode Island. In 2016, Ascensus College Savings partnered with Wealthfront, an automated investment service, to provide the state of Nevada with a 529 savings plan. This marks the first plan of this type to use an automated investment service.

Savings for individuals with disabilities
In February 2017, Illinois announced a 14-state partnership program, the National Achieving a Better Life Experience (ABLE) Alliance, the nation's largest multi-state agreement, that encourages residents to make investments to help disabled or blind citizens save for the future. Ascensus, through their Government Savings division, is administering the program.

Health savings
In the health savings space, the company partnered with Devenir in June 2016 to provide a private-labeled health savings account investment platform to banks and credit unions.

References

External links 
 

Financial services companies established in 1975
Financial services companies of the United States
American companies established in 1975
1975 establishments in the United States
Companies based in Montgomery County, Pennsylvania
Privately held companies based in Pennsylvania